Ayesha Miran rape case (victim's name is written sometimes as Ayesha Meeran or Ayesha Meera as well) was a rape case in the Vijayawada, India which captured the intense media attention in the country in 2007.

The Incident
A 17.5-year-old Pharmacy student named Ayesha Meera was raped and murdered brutally in a hostel in Vijayawada. Her body with stab injuries was found in the bathroom on 27 December 2007. A letter dropped by the 'murderer' stated that the girl was raped and murdered for refusing his request for 'love'.

Skepticism of police claims
Relatives of P. Satyam Babu  and Human Rights activists alleged that the police was trying to eliminate him in an effort to shield the real culprits in the case. They pointed out that Babu can't even walk as he suffered from a neurological disorder. He suffers from GB Syndrome and as a result had badly affected his nervous system and his two legs are paralysed. The doctors at Nizam's Institute of Medical Sciences (NIMS) confirmed that he could hardly walk. Even the victim's parents also rejected the police claim that Babu murdered her and alleged that police were trying to save some politically influential people.

Several activists had alleged that the police arrested Satyam Babu only as they could let Koneru Satish, the grandson of former deputy CM Koneru Ranga Rao off the case. Ayesha's parents also alleged that Koneru Satish and his friends were a regular visitors to the girls hostel as it was owned by his relative, Konera Padma.

Arrest, escape and re-arrest of the accused
P. Satyam Babu was first arrested in August 2008. However, he exhibited his agility soon after his arrest by escaping from police custody at Suryapet in Nalgonda district in the middle of the arrest night when the policemen escorting him got down at a hotel for food. Police were taking the accused to Vijayawada after treatment at a hospital in Hyderabad. The Vijayawada Police suspended 11 policemen, including a sub-inspector, two head constables and eight constables, who were escorting the accused on the charges of negligence. However, despite this effort to escape, Babu 
was arrested in Krishna district of Andhra Pradesh within hours of the event.

Judicial judgement
The Vijayawada women's special sessions court awarded 14 years jail to P. Satyam Babu in the case under section 302 of IPC for murder and 10 years of rigorous imprisonment under section 376 of IPC for rape. The court ruled that both the jail terms would run concurrently. In addition, the court ordered Satyam Babu to pay a fine of Rs 1,000 or undergo six months jail.

In a landmark judgment on 31 March 2017, the Hyderabad High Court not only acquitted the accused in the murder case but also awarded him 1 lakhs compensation for putting him in jail for eight years.
 The court in its judgment reprimanded the police for putting the accused in jail for eight years. The court said it was inhuman on the part of the police and ordered action against the officials responsible for Satyam Babu's arrest and confinement.

High Court of Andhra Pradesh in its Judgement on 29 November 2018 by Chief Justice Thottathil B. Radhakrishnan and Justice S V Bhatt directed the Central Bureau of Investigation to investigate the case afresh and directed the Andhra Pradesh Police to hand over the case to Central Bureau of Investigation. The Court observed that a High Court administered probe by a SIT unearthed the fact that even before the appeal of acquitted Satyam Babu was pending there has been destruction of records in the Trial Court.

Evidences and Findings
The autopsy report of doctors informs that Ayesha's body has stab injuries and she has been raped and then murdered. Semen traces were extracted from her body and many bite marks and scratch marks were identified throughout her body.

CBI investigation 
In January 2019, as a part of the investigation, CBI team grilled Satyam Babu at his home in Anasagaram village in Nandigama mandal. They also visited Koneru Satish at his house in Gudavalli village and took his statements.

References

Rape in India
Violence against women in India
Murder in India
Crime in Andhra Pradesh
2007 murders in India
Incidents of violence against women